Khayronbed ( Hayronbed) is a village in Sughd Region, northern Tajikistan. It is part of the jamoat Fondaryo in the Ayni District.

References

Populated places in Sughd Region